Macedonia Baptist Church is a historic church at 512 S. Indianola in Cuero, Texas.

It was built in 1890 and added to the National Register of Historic Places in 1988.

See also

National Register of Historic Places listings in DeWitt County, Texas

References

Baptist churches in Texas
Churches completed in 1890
19th-century Baptist churches in the United States
Churches on the National Register of Historic Places in Texas
Churches in DeWitt County, Texas
National Register of Historic Places in DeWitt County, Texas